Harcourt Arboretum is an arboretum owned and run by the University of Oxford. It is a satellite of the university's botanic garden in the city of Oxford, England. Professor Simon Hiscock is the Horti Praefectus (Director) of the botanic garden and arboretum.

The arboretum forms an integral part of the tree and plant collection of the University of Oxford Botanic Garden. It was designed to form an impressive entrance to the landscaped grounds of the house.

William Sawrey Gilpin (1762–1843), the artist and later landscape designer, laid out the pinetum, which forms the core of the arboretum. The trees are now mature, with giant redwoods and monkey-puzzle trees.

The grounds include a  typical English woodland and a  summer flowering meadow.
In late spring, the azaleas and rhododendrons are especially impressive. There are carpets of bluebells in the woods too. In the autumn, the leaf colours are brilliant, including Japanese maples. Peacocks roam the grounds, as they have since the establishment of the arboretum. In recent years, paths have been improved for accessibility.

The grounds are open to the public at a charge.

References

External links 

 Harcourt Arboretum information from the University of Oxford
 Harcourt Arboretum information from the University of Oxford Museum Education

Arboreta in England
Botanical gardens in England
Gardens in Oxfordshire
Departments of the University of Oxford
University of Oxford sites
Parks and open spaces in Oxfordshire